Herman Philipse (born 13 May 1951) is a professor of philosophy at Utrecht University in the Netherlands.  Philipse taught at Leiden University from 1986 until 2003 where he obtained his doctorate in 1983.

Work
Philipse has written many philosophical works in Dutch, including books on Husserl's early philosophy of logic, the role of certainty in Descartes' moral theory, and a widely read Atheist Manifesto (1995, 2004). In English, he has written over a dozen articles in philosophical journals, as well as a detailed assessment of Heidegger, Heidegger's Philosophy of Being: A Critical Interpretation.  He has also written many commentaries for Dutch newspapers (most frequently as a regular contributor to the NRC Handelsblad) and current events television programs, defending atheism and advocating cultural assimilation for non-European immigrants in the Netherlands.

In his philosophical work, Philipse defends a non-reductionist naturalism, akin to that of Gilbert Ryle, Peter Strawson, and P.M.S. Hacker.  While highly critical of the transcendental idealist tradition of Kant and Husserl for its allegedly incoherent notion of conceptual schemes, Philipse argues that scientistic philosophies that attempt to reduce consciousness to purely physical descriptions (such as those of Quine and Churchland) fall victim to a similar inconsistency: their theories logically depend on the concepts of ordinary human life they would abolish.  More generally, Philipse firmly defends the values of the Enlightenment: support for the natural sciences and political liberalism.

In 2012, he published God in the Age of Science. A Critique of Religious Reason.

During 2014-2019, Philipse presided a research programme on “Evolutionary Ethics: The (Meta-)Ethical Implications of Evolutionary Theory”, financed by the Dutch Research Council (NWO, Dutch: Nederlandse Organisatie voor Wetenschappelijk Onderzoek).

Selected bibliography
Works by Herman Philipse include:

See also
Dirk Verhofstadt
Etienne Vermeersch
Floris van den Berg

References

External links
 
 List of recent publications at Utrecht University
 Philipse's faculty page at Utrecht University
 YouTube video Is There a God? Herman Philipse & Richard Swinburne. An academic debate of Veritas Forum Amsterdam: Religious Belief in an Age of Science. 14 November 2016 Duration: 1:52:22. Consulted on 10 August 2021.

1951 births
Living people
20th-century Dutch philosophers
21st-century Dutch philosophers
Dutch atheism activists
Dutch republicans
Dutch skeptics
Atheist philosophers
Writers from The Hague
Phenomenologists
Academic staff of Utrecht University
Dutch atheists